Static is a 1985 American comedy-drama film directed by Mark Romanek in his feature directorial debut. The film stars Keith Gordon, Amanda Plummer, and Bob Gunton, and was released in 1985 by NFI Productions. It was shot in Page, Arizona and Lake Powell, Arizona. The film was written by the film's star Keith Gordon and director Mark Romanek, in his directorial debut, before he went on to direct numerous music videos for much his career.

Plot 
A quirky, out-of-place worker at a crucifix factory invents a device he claims can show pictures of Heaven. Discouraged and confused by the inability of those around him to see anything but a screenful of static, he charismatically hijacks a bus of friendly elderly people in order to get media attention for his invention.

Cast
 Keith Gordon as Ernie Blick
 Amanda Plummer as Julia Purcell
 Bob Gunton as Frank
 Janice Abbott as Sonya
 Reathel Bean as Fred Savins
 Kitty Mei-Mei Chen as Li
 Barton Heyman as Sheriff William Orling
 Jane Hoffman as Emily Southwick
 Lily Knight as Patty
 Joel Krehbeil as Deputy Tom Terrence
 Eugene Lee as Dale
 Jack Murakami as North
 Mike Murakami as South
 Uma Ridenhour as Sarah
 Mark Gordon as TV Announcer

Award and nominations

References

External links 
 
 
 

1985 comedy-drama films
1985 directorial debut films
1985 films
1985 independent films
American black comedy films
American comedy-drama films
American independent films
Films directed by Mark Romanek
Films shot in Arizona
Films shot in Nevada
1980s English-language films
1980s American films